Petra Kvitová won her second title at the Qatar Open, defeating Garbiñe Muguruza in the singles final, 6–2, 6–1, in a rematch of the 2018 final. Kvitová dropped just one set the entire tournament, to Anett Kontaveit in the quarterfinals.

Aryna Sabalenka was the defending champion, but she lost in the second round to Muguruza.

Seeds
The top four seeds received a bye into the second round.

Draw

Finals

Top half

Bottom half

Qualifying

Seeds

Qualifiers

Lucky loser
  Misaki Doi

Draw

First qualifier

Second qualifier

Third qualifier

Fourth qualifier

Notes

References
Main draw
Qualifying draw

2021 WTA Tour
2021 Singles
2021 in Qatari sport